Pechatka is a rural locality (a village) in Beryozovsky District, Perm Krai, Russia. The population was 15 as of 2010.

Geography 
Pechatka is located 19 km northeast of  Beryozovka (the district's administrative centre) by road. Sosnovka is the nearest rural locality.

References 

Rural localities in Beryozovsky District, Perm Krai